Take Me to Your Future is the twenty fifth studio/live album produced under the Hawkwind name, a 2006 dual disc of new studio audio and archive live videos by Hawkwind.

The cover is based on Georgia O'Keeffe's 1927 painting Radiator Building - Night, New York of the American Radiator Building.

Audio side
"Uncle Sam’s on Mars" (Calvert, Brock, House, King) - 8:18 - new version
"Small Boy" (Calvert, Brock) - 3:16 - from The Brock/Calvert Project album.
"The Reality of Poverty" (Morley, Brock) - 9:08
"Ode to a Timeflower" (Calvert, Brock) - 4:05 - from The Brock/Calvert Project album.
"Silver Machine" (Calvert, Brock) - 6:58 - remix

Video side
"Images" - from the forthcoming DVD Space Bandits
"Utopia" - from the forthcoming DVD Australia 2000 
"Assassins of Allah" - from the forthcoming DVD Winter Solstice 2005
"The Golden Void" - from the forthcoming DVD Treworgey Tree Fayre 1989
"Steppenwolf" - 1996 rehearsal footage
"Don’t be Donkish" - Hawkfest 2002 and 2003 footage 
"Paradox" - Take Me to Your Leader launch party footage myspace

Personnel 
Hawkwind
Robert Calvert - vocals
Dave Brock - guitar, keyboards, vocals
Alan Davey - bass guitar, vocals
Richard Chadwick - drums
Simon House - violin track 3
Arthur Brown - vocals track 3
Lemmy - vocals track 5

References

Hawkwind albums
2006 albums